Love Will See You Through is the first album by the rock group Phil Lesh and Friends.    It is also known as Highlights Volume One.  It was recorded live at June 4-5, 1999 at the Warfield Theatre and released later that year.

In addition to Phil Lesh, this version of the constantly changing lineup of Phil Lesh and Friends includes Jorma Kaukonen (Jefferson Airplane, Hot Tuna), Steve Kimock (Kingfish, Missing Man Formation, The Other Ones), Pete Sears (Rod Stewart, Jefferson Starship, Hot Tuna), Prairie Prince (The Tubes, Journey, Missing Man Formation), Caitlin Cornwell, and Zoe Ellis.  Lesh and Kaukonen each sing lead vocals on about half the songs on the album, and the band's vocal capabilities are enhanced by backup singers Cornwell and Ellis.  As usual for Phil Lesh and Friends, the musical emphasis is on jam band style interpretations of Grateful Dead songs, although the album also includes a few numbers from the Airplane and Hot Tuna repertoire.

Track listing

CD One

"Dancin' in the Street" (Stevenson, Gaye, I. Hunter) – 22:07
"Broken Arrow" (Robertson) – 8:56
"Big Boss Man" (Dixon, Smith) – 6:57
"Friend of the Devil" (Garcia, Dawson, Hunter) – 6:46
"Mr. Charlie" (McKernan, Hunter) – 8:04
"Mississippi Half Step Uptown Toodeloo" (Garcia, Hunter) – 8:58
"Franklin's Tower" (Garcia, Kreutzmann, Hunter) – 14:35

CD Two

"Dupree's Diamond Blues" (Garcia, Hunter) – 4:39
"I Am the Light of This World" (Davis) – 4:05
"Good Shepherd" (traditional, arranged by Kaukonen) – 10:55
"Mashed Potato Jam"  (Kaukonen, Kimock, Lesh, Prince, Sears) – 12:46
"New Potato Caboose" (Lesh, Peterson) – 3:31
"Caboose Jam" (Kaukonen, Kimock, Lesh, Prince, Sears) – 10:47
"St. Stephen" (Garcia, Lesh, Hunter) – 26:02

Note: CD Two, tracks 4-6 recorded June 4, 1999; remainder recorded June 5, 1999.

Personnel

Phil Lesh and Friends

Phil Lesh — bass, vocals
Jorma Kaukonen — guitar, vocals
Steve Kimock — guitar
Pete Sears — keyboards
Prairie Prince — drums
Caitlin Cornwell — vocals
Zoe Ellis — vocals

Production
Phil and Jill Lesh – producers
Jill Lesh for Cygnus Productions – management
Jeffrey Norman – recording
John Cutler – mixing
Ram Rod, Steve Parish, Steve Kimock – crew
Prairie Prince, Mick Anger – cover art
Jay Blakesberg, Susana Millman – photography
Gecko Graphics – design

References

Phil Lesh albums
1999 live albums
Grateful Dead Records albums